Karl Sitter (6 June 1928 – 2 November 2020) was an Austrian rower. He competed in the men's coxed four event at the 1948 Summer Olympics.

References

1928 births
2020 deaths
Austrian male rowers
Olympic rowers of Austria
Rowers at the 1948 Summer Olympics
Place of birth missing